The Parascender II is an American powered parachute that was designed and produced by Parascender Technologies of Kissimmee, Florida. Now out of production, when it was available the aircraft was supplied as a kit for amateur construction.

Design and development
The Parascender II was designed to comply with the US FAR 103 Ultralight Vehicles trainer exemption and also the US Experimental - Amateur-built aircraft rules. It features a  parachute-style wing, two-seats-in-tandem accommodation, tricycle landing gear and a single  Rotax 503 engine in pusher configuration.

The aircraft carriage is built from bolted aluminium tubing, with a unique octagonal dual-tube propeller guard. In flight steering is accomplished via foot pedals that actuate the canopy brakes, creating roll and yaw. On the ground the aircraft has lever-controlled nosewheel steering. The main landing gear incorporates spring rod suspension and was changed to composite suspension in 1993.

The manufacturer estimated the construction time from the supplied kit as 20 hours.

Operational history
In April 2015 six examples were registered in the United States with the Federal Aviation Administration, although a total of eight had been registered at one time.

Specifications (Parascender II)

References

External links
Photo of a Parascender II in flight

Parascender II
1990s United States sport aircraft
1990s United States ultralight aircraft
Single-engined pusher aircraft
Powered parachutes